opened in 2000 in Shimoda, Shizuoka Prefecture, Japan, to house the collection of  of Taisho Pharmaceutical. The collection includes works by Corot, Monet, Cézanne, Renoir, Fujishima Takeji, and Kishida Ryūsei.

See also
 Shizuoka Prefectural Museum of Art
Ion the list of collections  LYNN CHADWICK'S  THREE ELEKTRAS 1968  should be mentioned.

References

External links
  Uehara Museum of Modern Art
  Uehara Museum of Modern Art - Collection

Shimoda, Shizuoka
Museums in Shizuoka Prefecture
Art museums and galleries in Japan
Art museums established in 2000
2000 establishments in Japan